Kris Aquino is a Filipina television host, actress, endorser and producer.

1990 was the start of her movie career. Her mother, the late Corazon Aquino did not want to her to enter showbiz at first, but was later convinced and approved Kris' first mainstream movie, Pido Dida: Sabay Tayo with the popular comedian so called Cheetaeh, Rene Requiestas. In that movie, she got the status of Box-office queen in 1990.  She later shifted into other roles, notably in massacre films such as Vizconde Massacre, Myrna Diones Story, Elsa Castillo-Ang Katotohanan, and Humanda Ka Mayor. Kris' biggest break in the entertainment film industry was her Mano Po series where she won the status of Best Supporting Actress given by a lot of award-giving bodies. After that, her movies became blockbusters, especially when she shifted into horror films starting from Feng Shui, Sukob and a lot more. Since 2010, she started co-producing her films (Dalaw, Segunda Mano, and Sisterakas) until she established her own production firm in 2013, K Productions with its debut movie Instant Mommy. In 2013, she starred in My Little Bossings with her son Bimby Aquino Yap, Vic Sotto, and Ryzza Mae Dizon. 2014 was the year when the sequel of the blockbuster hit movie Feng Shui was released.

In 2015, she will be starring in a romantic-drama movie based on a popular novel, Etiquette for Mistresses and her official MMFF 2015 entry, All You Need Is Pag-Ibig (formerly entitled Mr. and Mrs. Split).

1986 was the start of her television career, she first appeared on Inday Badiday's See True. With her movie career slowing, Aquino shifted her sights to a television career as a talk show host and gossiper with the launching of Kris, produced by Viva Television on Channel 4 (at that time named PTV, it was transferred to GMA Network, which had a partnership with Viva, and after Viva's contract with PTV ended). It was on GMA Network's showbiz oriented talk show Startalk, which she co-hosted with Boy Abunda and Lolit Solis, that her hosting skills attracted attention. After GMA Network and VIVA dropped her, she went back to ABS-CBN in 1996 and had her biggest break through the morning talk show Today with Kris Aquino. From that show, she gained more popularity in terms of hosting. From January 2001 to May 2002, she hosted the talk show Morning Girls with Kris and Korina, alongside popular broadcast journalist Korina Sanchez, which was intended to last for only two weeks, but went on for 16 months. In 2004, she starred in her very first teleserye Hiram. In 2007, she officially left The Buzz and Pilipinas, Game KNB? after giving birth to her second son, James. She was replaced by Edu Manzano on Pilipinas, Game KNB?. According to Aquino, she had to give up her hosting stint on the shows to devote more time to her live-in partners. She may not have wanted to return to The Buzz because she no longer wanted to work with former co-host Cristy Fermin. Aquino hosted the Philippine franchise of Deal or No Deal, which is part of ABS-CBN's primetime lineup. It ended its first season on 23 February 2007. The second season of the game show started on 11 June 2007. She hosted Boy and Kris, a morning talk show. She hosted another TV franchise, Wheel of Fortune, which replaced Kapamilya, Deal or No Deal. In October 2008, after former The Buzz co-host Cristy Fermin was suspended by ABS-CBN, the Kapamilya network asked Aquino to once again host the top-rated showbiz-oriented talk show with Boy Abunda and Ruffa Gutierrez. After much controversy, Aquino hosted The Buzz again beginning on 26 October 2008. In 2009, she hosted Pinoy Bingo Night and The Price Is Right in 2011.

She was a resident judge of Pilipinas Got Talent from Seasons 1-4 (2010–2013). She officially left SNN: Showbiz News Ngayon on 25 June 2010, and The Buzz on 27 June 2010, after being an on-and-off main host of the show for 10 years. Despite taking a leave for her family, she hosted ABS-CBN's new noontime variety show called Pilipinas Win Na Win. Aquino hosted her morning talk show entitled Kris TV since 2011 until 2016 when she officially taking a hiatus in the showbiz industry and leave ABS-CBN.

Kris TV and All You Need Is Pag-Ibig are her last TV/movie appearances to date. She is set to be back on TV through Trip ni Kris to be aired on GMA Network in 2017.

Film

Mainstream

Cameo appearances

Television

Entertainment talk shows

Variety shows

Game shows

Teleserye

Current affairs/News

Reality/Talent shows

Comedy/Sitcom

TV specials/Documentaries

References

Deal or No Deal
Philippine filmographies
Actress filmographies